A sports novel is a genre of novel that focuses on the theme of sports and athletics in general. The characters, especially the protagonist, are typically athletes, with a setting in the real world (typically in present-day or recent history), and a plot that revolves around sports competitions. The themes typically involve character growth, and overcoming obstacles.

See also
Sports film
Sports magazine
Sports video game
Sports journalism

References 

 
Literary genres